Nicole Arendt and Laura Golarsa were the defending champions but did not compete that year.

Chanda Rubin and Brenda Schultz-McCarthy won in the final 6–4, 6–3 against Katrina Adams and Debbie Graham.

Seeds
Champion seeds are indicated in bold text while text in italics indicates the round in which those seeds were eliminated.

 Chanda Rubin /  Brenda Schultz-McCarthy (champions)
 Amanda Coetzer /  Linda Wild (first round)
 Nicole Bradtke /  Inés Gorrochategui (semifinals)
 Amy Frazier /  Kimberly Po (semifinals)

Draw

External links
 1996 IGA Classic Doubles Draw

U.S. National Indoor Championships
1996 WTA Tour